The murders of Kerry Ann Graham and Francine Marie Trimble are currently unsolved crimes that occurred in December 1978, when both girls—aged 15 and 14 respectively—disappeared after leaving their homes in Forestville, California, to visit a shopping mall in Santa Rosa.

Due to the advanced state of decomposition of the girls' remains, the specific cause of death of each victim has never been established, although both girls' deaths have always been considered to be a homicide. Furthermore, Graham's body was mistakenly identified as that of a male until genetic testing proved otherwise.

The bodies of Kerry Graham and Francine Trimble would remain unidentified until November 2015, when their identities were confirmed via the use of DNA profiling. The case itself remains one of the oldest cold cases within Mendocino County.

Disappearances
Graham and Trimble both resided in Forestville, California. The two girls were next-door neighbors and inseparable friends, having known one another since they had become acquainted while attending elementary school. On December 16, 1978, the two girls left their homes, reportedly to visit the Coddingtown Mall in Santa Rosa, with Graham having informed her mother of her intentions to shop for Christmas gifts prior to leaving her household. Neither family ever heard from their daughter again.

Within 24 hours of her disappearance, Trimble's mother had filed a missing person report on her daughter with the Sonoma County Sheriff's Office; Graham was reported missing to the same sheriff's office on Christmas Eve the same month. Family members of both girls informed investigators of their fears that their daughters had become the victims of foul play, perhaps having been kidnapped prior to their departing to the mall from the Trimble residence, and possibly by someone they knew, as there were no signs of a disturbance having occurred at either girl's residence, and makeup was found arranged upon a dresser in Trimble's bedroom. In addition, neither girl had taken any personal possessions from her household prior to her disappearance, and although Graham was known to have previously run away from her home, at the time of her disappearance, she had recently undergone an operation to remove her appendix, and was still physically recovering from the procedure, having also left her prescribed antibiotics in her bedroom. Nonetheless, neither family could completely discount the possibility the girls may have hitchhiked to various regions, including New Jersey, or as far as Nova Scotia, Canada.

Initially, investigators concluded Graham had arrived at Trimble's home on the date of the girls' disappearance when no other member of Francine's family had been present within the household, and that the two girls were likely together at the time of their disappearance later that day. Furthermore, although investigators initially concluded the most likely explanation for the girls' disappearance was that they had been runaways, they could not discount the families' theory both girls had been abducted from Trimble's home. As no signs of a struggle were noted within the Trimble household, had this been the case, the two girls would have either known their abductor, or been taken from the residence at gunpoint. The aunt of Francine Trimble would later recollect that on one occasion, out of sheer desperation, her family had contacted a psychic in the hope of obtaining information regarding the girls' whereabouts and welfare.

Discovery
The unclothed, skeletal remains of Graham and Trimble were discovered by two tourists traveling to Fort Bragg, California on the afternoon of July 8, 1979. Following a minor argument within the car, the two tourists had stopped their vehicle on private land near the Jackson Demonstration State Forest, alongside Highway 20 in Mendocino County, approximately 12 miles west of Willits and 80 miles from the girls' residences. One of these individuals exited his vehicle to briefly walk in the vicinity where the two had parked. Venturing into a steep, heavily overgrown area near James Creek, this individual located a human skull protruding from a shallow grave in brush midway down an embankment of the creek, a short distance from the road. The tourists left a can of soda at the side of the road to mark the location of the remains and drove to the city of Willits, where they reported their discovery to the police.

Responding to the tourists' discovery, Mendocino County sheriff's deputies extensively searched the area in and around James Creek, finding numerous skeletal remains later determined to belong to two individuals. Both victims had been bound with duct tape and concealed within plastic, before being buried in a shallow grave. Sections of duct tape, hair, and numerous bones were scattered in the vicinity of this grave—indicating the bodies had been disturbed by wild animals. Investigators would subsequently conclude the two victims had been murdered elsewhere, and their bodies later buried at the scene of their discovery, with this act most likely occurring after nightfall. No clothing was present with either set of remains, although a solitary shell earring depicting a bird—later determined to belong to Francine Trimble—was discovered at the scene.

Following a two-day search of the crime scene, in which approximately 90 percent of the victims' bones were recovered with FBI assistance, the remains recovered from the embankment alongside Highway 20 were sent to the coroner's office to undergo a thorough forensic examination.

Investigation

Initial examination
The initial autopsies conducted upon the remains recovered from James Creek revealed little accurate forensic information about the victims beyond the fact both had been approximately 14 years of age, likely of Caucasian race, and that the two victims had likely been murdered on or about December 8, 1978. However, the coroner was unable to determine whether the victims' remains were male or female, but after further examining the remains with the assistance of a forensic pathologist, declared one decedent had been male and the other female. By 1980, the results of all tests conducted upon the remains had been concluded. The results of these initial examinations also established several approximations of the physical statistics of the victims, including their sexes, ages and heights, and although the actual cause of the victims' deaths could not be determined due to the advanced state of decomposition and the lack of any evident trauma upon the largely skeletal remains, both the coroner and the forensic pathologist could not exclude the possibility that each victim had been strangled to death.

Although both victims were correctly determined to be of Caucasian race, both the coroner and the forensic pathologist determined they could not be completely sure of the specific ethnicity, or the precise gender of one of the recovered bodies, which was initially determined to be that of a male. The initial autopsy reports also erroneously concluded the two victims may have been related, stating there was a "high probability" the two decedents were a brother and sister.

The age of this victim was initially placed as being between 10 and 20 years old—perhaps being no older than 14. Her remains were found with a single earring of a bird, presumed to be handmade and constructed from a shell-like material described as being often seen in the works of "hippies and Native Americans."

The age of this victim was also initially placed as being between 10 and 20 years old—perhaps being no older than 13. As had been the case with the first body recovered from James Creek, this decedent also had light brown hair, and had received excellent dental care in her lifetime, having never undergone a tooth filling procedure.

Following their initial autopsies, the girls' remains—informally known simply as "John Doe" and "Jane Doe" among homicide detectives—were interred in a cement crypt in the Russian River Cemetery in the city of Ukiah.

Developments
By 1985, the remains recovered from James Creek had remained unidentified for six years. The same year, all evidence pertaining to the case was submitted to the FBI to undergo further examination, although the case would largely remain cold for the following 15 years. Nonetheless, on several occasions between the years of 2000 and 2011, the decedents' remains would be exhumed to undergo further forensic analysis in an effort to determine their identities.

Speculation as to the accuracy of the initial theory of a probable relation between the victims first arose in 2000 when a further examination of the decedents' dental charting revealed dissimilarities too great for the pair to have been biologically related. The initial assumption the victims had been related was first questioned by a forensic odontologist named Jim Wood who, having closely examined the jawbone of each victim, concluded the jaw structure and actual dentition were too dissimilar for the decedents to have been related, and further opined his belief that both victims had most likely been female. This belief that both victims had not been related was formally confirmed via an examination of the victims' mitochondrial DNA the following year, which conclusively determined that the two victims had not been maternally related.

Despite these revelations, speculation remained the decedents may have been in a romantic relationship, which may have been a reason why they were together at the time of their deaths. As no contemporary missing persons reports of a male and a female missing since late 1978 or early 1979 existed in California which matched the physical characteristics of the decedents, theories remained that the pair may have hitchhiked to California, perhaps from as far away as the Midwestern United States, and possibly as runaways.

Facial reconstructions
Beginning in the 1990s, several forensic facial reconstructions of the decedents were created and released to the media depicting reconstructions of just how the two decedents may have physically appeared in life. Initially, these reconstructions had been in the form of clay sculptures created using three dimensional photographs of the victims' skulls to create forensic models of the physical appearances of their faces. With advances in technology, these clay sculptures would be replaced by digital reconstructions of the decedents—still believed to have been a male and a female—that were released to the media in the early 2000s.

In July 2012, the National Center for Missing & Exploited Children released updated, digital renderings of the victims' faces. These renditions had been obtained with the assistance of a forensic anthropologist, who—via performing a modern CT scan upon the skulls of the two decedents—had been able to construct a more accurate digital, three-dimensional reconstruction of the victims' faces as they had most likely physically appeared in life. This forensic examination had also narrowed the ages of both victims to being most likely aged between 13- and 15-years-old at the time of their death, although the anthropologist did not question the original 1980 conclusion that one of the victims' skulls had been that of a male.

This entire process was covered by the BBC America network, who had paid to have the victims' skeletalized remains exhumed in 2011 in order to produce a documentary detailing ongoing cold case investigations within the United States and worldwide as part of a series they had commissioned titled Naming the Dead. This documentary had detailed just how the National Center for Missing & Exploited Children utilize modern technology, the work of forensic artists, the Internet, and general law enforcement determination in the hopes of identifying unidentified child murder victims, and the methods currently used to do so, with these two decedents intended as being the primary case focused upon within this program within the series.

Identification
Some contemporary missing persons reports had erroneously listed the date of Graham and Trimble's disappearance as being 24 December 1979, whereas Graham had been reported missing by her mother on 24 December 1978. Furthermore, all primary sources pertaining to the two decedents had listed Graham's remains as being those of a male until DNA testing conducted in 2014 concluded her remains were actually those of a female. When these errors had been corrected, as a result of the renewed publicity and focus on the case following the 2012 screening of the BBC America series highlighting the work of forensic artists at the National Center for Missing and Exploited Children, a sibling of Kerry Graham contacted authorities voicing her concerns one of the decedents may be her missing sister, adding that at the time of her disappearance, she had been in the company of Francine Trimble. As investigators had initially concluded the two girls were likely together at the time of their disappearance, DNA samples were obtained from family members of both girls. These samples were entered into both the National Missing and Unidentified Persons System and the National Center for Missing & Exploited Children databases for comparison with nationwide unsolved murders and unidentified decedents (within which the subjects of whose DNA, odontological, anthropological, and other general information already exists).

These DNA comparisons later corroborated this sibling's belief. Consequently, 36 years after their murders, the two decedents discovered alongside Highway 20 in Mendocino County on July 8, 1979 were formally identified as being Kerry Ann Graham and Francine Marie Trimble. The formal identifications were made in November 2015, and later announced to the media via a February 2016 joint press conference held by the Mendocino and Sonoma county sheriff's offices in Mendocino's county seat of Ukiah, and in which both girls' families were informed that the disappearances of Graham and Trimble had never been connected with the remains discovered alongside Highway 20 as police had originally believed the victims had been a young boy and a young girl, and that a likely factor in the original misidentification of one of the bodies as being that of a male was that much of the skeletal structure of young females typically resembles those of males until a female begins to physically mature.

Following this formal announcement, one of the individuals who had worked on the forensic reconstruction of the victims' faces was to state: "It's been such a collaborative effort giving these victims back their names; an identity that has been lost for 30-plus years. It's extraordinary that we were able to help the investigation and these families find answers to their questions. I can't sum up how incredible that is."

The remains of Kerry Graham and Francine Trimble were released to the surviving members of their families in February 2016. At a press conference, one family member stated that although both families had "largely resigned [themselves]" to the fact foul play was an extremely likely reason the girls had disappeared, both families were "glad to know" the girls' bodies had been identified, in order that they could receive a dignified burial by their families.

Ongoing investigations
Mendocino County investigators have stated that although no official suspects have been identified, investigations into the deaths are ongoing, with the case being "as active as it's ever been". Mendocino County Sheriff Tom Allman has also stated that with the identification of the victims, investigators are hoping to obtain more information about the hours leading up to the girls' disappearance in the hopes of capturing the individual or individuals responsible for their deaths and the subsequent concealment of their remains.

Persons of interest
Although no definite suspects have ever been named in the murders, the murders of Kerry Graham and Francine Trimble remain an open and active case. In 2000, a man incarcerated at a New Jersey prison falsely confessed to the murders. This false confession had led to the first exhumation of the victims' bodies from the cement crypt in which their remains had been interred following their initial autopsies. This individual was quickly excluded as a suspect in the case after investigators discovered he would have been approximately 12 years old at the time of the murders, in addition to the fact that this individual had "never [even] left New Jersey" in his lifetime. The man is believed to have falsely confessed to the girls' murders after reading about the case in a local newspaper.

Investigators have also stated that they are eager to learn more details surrounding the girls' deaths in order to conclusively prove they were murdered. It is unknown if Graham and Trimble had hitchhiked to the Coddingtown Mall, had ever reached their destination, or even if they had actually intended to visit the Coddingtown Mall on the date of their disappearance. According to a friend of the two girls named Eileen Goetz, she had last seen Graham and Trimble in the grounds of El Molino High School on the date of their disappearance. The two girls had joined Goetz to smoke cigarettes in a parking lot near the school's tennis courts. According to Goetz, neither girl had actually attended school that day, and had informed her (Goetz) of their intentions to hitchhike to a party in Santa Rosa. Both girls had asked Goetz whether she wished to accompany them to the party, but she declined this offer. Another friend would later state that on the date of Graham and Trimble's disappearance, she had seen the two girls hitchhiking near a local Chevron gas station.

Several serial killers such as Rodney Alcala and Gerald and Charlene Gallego have been identified as potential persons of interest in the murders of Graham and Trimble. The speculation of a serial killer as being the perpetrator of this crime was partly conceived due to the number of young females abducted and murdered in California during the late 1970s—some within the same county of the victims' disappearance. A possible connection to the Santa Rosa hitchhiker murders has also been suggested, although the confirmed victims in this case were murdered between 1972 and 1976.

No definitive suspects in the murders of Kerry Graham and Francine Trimble have been officially named.

See also

 Cold case
 Crime in California
 List of solved missing persons cases
 Lists of unsolved murders
 Santa Rosa hitchhiker murders
 The Doe Network
 Unidentified decedent

Notes

References

Further reading

External links

 2012 Press Democrat article detailing the release of digitally reconstructed facial compositions of the then-unidentified bodies of Graham and Trimble
 Contemporary news article pertaining to the identification of the girls' bodies
 Times-Standard news article pertaining to a 2016 press conference relating to the identification of the girls' bodies

1978 murders in the United States
1979 in California
Deaths by person in California
December 1978 events in the United States
Female murder victims
History of women in California
Incidents of violence against girls
Missing person cases in California
Murdered American children
Unsolved murders in the United States
Violence against women in the United States